Eanberht, King of Hwicce, jointly with Uhtred and Ealdred.

In 757 Eanberht, Uhtred, and Ealdred, granted land to Bishop Milred, and in 759 to Abbot Headda.

See also
Hwicce

References

External links
 ; see also 

Hwiccan monarchs
8th-century English monarchs